Garden City High School may refer to:
Garden City High School (Kansas)
Garden City High School (Michigan)
Garden City High School (New York)
Garden City High School (Texas)